This is a list of the educational institutions in Kannur District, State of Kerala, India.

Universities
 Kannur University, Thavakkara

Medical Colleges
 Government Ayurveda College, Kannur
 Parrasianikkadavu Ayurveda Medical College, Kannur
 Kannur Dental College, Anjarakkandy
 Academy of Medical Sciences, Pariyaram
 Kannur Medical College, Anjarakkandy

Professional Colleges

 University Department of Engineering
 University Teacher Education College Puzhathi
 Sree Narayana Guru College of Engineering and Technology
 Jaybees Training College of B.Ed. 	
 Sir Syed Institute of Technology 
 Aditya Kiran College of Applied Studies
 S.U.M.College of Teacher Education 	  VARAM
 Salafi B.Ed.College 	  Kanhirode
Government College of Engineering 
 Govt.College of Teacher Education 	  Thalassery
St Thomas college of engineering and technology (STM), Sivapuram, Mattanur
 
College of Engineering Thalassery 	  Eranholi
 Keyi Sahibtraining College 	  Taliparamba
 Sir Syed Institute for Technical Studies 	  Taliparamba
 Chinmaya Institute of Technology 	  Pathiriyad
 Vimal Jyothi Engineering College 	  Chemperi
 Rajeev Memorial College of Teacher Education 	  Mattannur
 P.K.M.College of Education 	  Taliparamba
 Crescent B.Ed.College 	  Payyannur
Alsalama college of optometry and management studies, south bazar, makani

Arts and Science Colleges
 Aditya Kiran College of Applied Studies, Kannur
 Bhaskara College of Arts, Kannur
 Chinmaya Arts and Science for Women, Kannur
 College of Applied Science, Kuthuparamba
 College of Applied Science, Neruvambram
 College of Applied Science, Taliparamba
 Co-Operative Arts and Science College, Pazhayangadi
 Devamatha Arts and Science College, Paisakari
Govt. Brennen College, Thalasery
 Gurudev Arts and Science College, Mathil
 I.T.M. College of Arts and Science, Kannur
 Jamia Hamdard, Kannur
 Krishna Menon Memorial women's College, Kannur
 M.G. College, Iritty, Kannur
 Mahatma Gandhi Arts and Science, Kannur
 Mary Matha Arts and Science College, Alakode
 M M Knowledge Arts And Science College,Karakund
 N.A.M. College, Kallikandy
 Nirmalagiri College, Kuthuparamba
 Payyannur College, Payyannur
 Pazhassi raja N.S.S. College, Kannur
 S.E.S. College, Sreekandapuram 
 S.N. College, Cannanore,
 Sir Syed College, Karimbam
 Sir Syed Institute for Technical Studies, Taliparamba
 Sree Sankaracharya University of Sanskrit, Payyannur
 Taliparamba Arts and Science College, Taliparamba

Indian Certificate of Secondary Education|ICSE Schools
 Sreepuram School, Kannur
 Seventh Day School, Iritty
 St. Francis School, Thottada
 St. Anne's School, Payyavoor.

Central Board of Secondary Education|CBSE Schools
 Al Maquar School, Thangalpeedika 
 Alphonsa School, Keezhpally
 Amritha Vidyalayam (Kannur, Kuthuparamba and Punnol)
 Army School, Kannur
 Benhill School, Iritty
 Bharathiya Vidya Bhavan (Taliparamba, and Kannur)
 Chinmaya Vidyalaya (Kannur, Taliparamba and Payyanur)
 CMI Christ School, Thalassery
 Crescent SChool, Valapattanam
 Dr. Gundert School, Tellicherry
 Ezhimala School, Ramanthali
 Fazl Omar School, Koodali
 Fusco School, Eruvessy
 Gracious School, Mayyil
 Holy Cross School, Naduvil
 ISD SChool, Payyannur
 Indira Gandhi School, Mambram
 Ishlahi School, Irikkur
Jawahar Navodaya Vidyalaya, Chendayadu
 Kadambbur School, Etakkad
 Kaoser School, Pulloopy
 Kendiriya Vidyalaya, Kannur
 Kendriya Vidyalaya, Mangattuparamba
 Kendriya Vidyalaya, Payyannur
 Latheefiya School, Payyannur
 MES School, Panoor
 Little Flower School, Karuvanchal
 Majlis School, Uliyil
 Malabar School, Koottumugham
 Mary Matha School, Pilathara
 Marygiri School, Koottumugham
 Modern School, Taliparamba
 Nithyananda School, Chirakkal
 Navajyothi School, Peravoor
 PES School, Payyanur
 Perfect School, Muzhappilangad
 Progressive School, Payangadi
 Royal School, Taliparamba
 Sal Sabeel School, Sreekandapuram
 Safa School, Mattool
 Sanjos School, Taliparamba
 Sree Narayana School, Punnol
 Sree Narayana School, Kuthuparmba
 SN Vidya Mandir, Kannur
 Sree Sankara Vidya Peedam, Mattannur
 St.Mary's School, Alakode
 Tellicherry Public SChool, Kindoormala
 Thunchathacharya Vidyalayam, Edachovva
 Urusuline School, Kannur
Kasthurba Public School, Chirakkal
 Zahra Public School, Thangalpeedika, Mokeri

Kerala Syllabus High Schools
 Aroli GHSS
 Azhikkal GRFT VHSS
 Azhikode GHSS
 Chala GHSS
 Chatukapara GHSS
 Chelora GHSS
 Cherukkunnu Welfare GHSS
 Cherukunnu Boys GHSS
 Cherukunnu GVHSS
 Cheruthazham GHSS
 Chuzhali GHSS
 Ettikulam M.A.Sahib Smaraka GHSS
 Iriukkur GHSS
 Jamia Al-Maqar, Taliparamba
 Kadannapally GHSS
 Kallisassery KPRG Smaraka GHSS
 Kaniyanchal GHSS
 Kannadiparamba GHSS
 Kannur City GHSS
 Kannur  GVHSS for Girls
 Kannur GVHSS
 Kannur Town GHSS
 Karivellur AV Smaraka GHSS
 Karthikapuram GVHSS
 Korome GHSS
 Kottila GHSS
 Koyyam GHSS
 Kozhichal GHSS
 Kuhimangalam GHSS
 Kurumathur GVHSS
 Madayi GBHSS /GVHSS
 Madayi GGHSS
 Malapattam AKS GHSS
 Mathamangalam GHSS
 Mathil GHSS
 Mattool CHMKS GHSS
 Mayyil IMNS GHSS 
 Morazha GHSS
 Munderi GHSS
 Muzhapilangad GHSS
 Neduungome GHSS
 Padiyoor GHSS
 Pallikunnu GHSS
 Pappinissery E M S SmarakaGHSS
 Pariyaram KKNPM GVHSS
 Pattuvam GHSS
 Pattuvam Model Res.H.SS
 Payyannur GGHSS
 Payyanur AKAS GVHSS
 Payyannur NSS Memorial GHSS
 Peralasery AKG Smaraka GHSS
 Peringome GHSS
 Prapoil GHSS
 Puliongome GVHSS
 Puzhathi GHSS
 Ramanthali GHSS
 Sreekandapuram GHSS
 Sreeppuram GHSS
St. Michael's School, Kannur
Taliparamba Tagore Vidayaniketan
 GHSS (GVHSS)
 Thirumeni GHSS
 Thottada GHSS
 Ulikkal  P.K.Panchayath GHSS
 Valapattanam GHSS
 Vayakara GHSS
 Vellur GHSS
 Alakode NSS HSS
 Anjarakanday HSS
 Azhikode HSS
 Chadanakkampara Cherupushpa HSS
 Chapparapadavu HSS
 Chembilode HSS
 Chempanthotty St George HS
 Chempery Nirmla HSS
 Cherupuzha St Marys HS
 Chirakkal Rajas HSS
 Chov va HSS
 Elayavoor CHM HSS
 Kadacharia HSS
 Kadambur HSS
 Kambil Moplia HSS
 Kannur DIS Girls HSS
 Kannur St Michles Anglo Ind HSS
 Kannur St Teresa Anglo.Ind. HSS
 Payyannur St Marys Girls HS
 Kudianmala Mary Queen HSS
 Madampam Maryland HS
 Manikadavu St Thomas HS
 Naduvil HSS
 Nellikutty St Augustain HS
 Paisakkary Devamatha HSS
 Parassinikadavu HSS
 Payyavoor Sacred Heart HSS
 Perumpadavu BVJM HSS
 Pulikurumba St Joseph HS
 Puthiyangadi Jamat HSS
Moothedath Higher Secondary School
 Seethi Sahib H S S, Taliparamba
 Thaynery SABTM HSS,
 Thertally Mary Giri HS
 Thottada S.N.Trust HSS
 Vayattuparmba St Joseph HSS
 Vellora Tagore HSS
 Taliparamba Sir Syed HS
 Bekkalam Jaybees Public HS
 Cherupuzha St Joseph ENG.MED. HSS
 Irikkur Rehmaniya Orphanage HSS
 Thiruvattur Jama-ath HS
 Kannur Deenul Sabha ENG.MED HSS
 Madai Crescent English Med. HSS
 Mattool Najath Girls HSS
 Muttam Rehmaniya HS
 Naduvil  St.Mary's E.M.HS
 Narath Falah Eng.Med.HS
 Pappinissery Hidayath Eng.Med. HS
 Payyangadi Wadi Huda  HSS
 Payyannur Khayidemllath Mem HSS Kavvayi
 Pushpagiri St.Joseph HS
 Ramanathali CHM Koya Mem HS
 Valapattanam Tajul Uloom Orphanage HSS
 Valapattanam Muslim W A HSS
 Aralam GHSS
 Aralam  Farm GHS
 ChavasseryGHSS
 Cherakkra GHSS (GVHSS)
GVHSS Kadirur (Government VHSS Kadirur)
 Cheruvanchery P.G Memorial GHSS
 Chittariparamba GHSS
 Chundangapoil GHSS
 Edayannur GHSS (GVHSS)
 Kavumbhagam GHSS
 Koduvally GVHSS
 Kottayam (Malabar) GHSS
 Kuthuparamba GHSS
 Malur GHSS
 Mambram GHSS
 Manathana GHSS
 Pala GHSS
 Palayad GHSS
 Pattiam GHSS
 Pinarayi A.K.G.M. GHSS
 Thalassery GGHSS
 Thalassery Brennen  GHSS
 Thiruvangad GHSS
 Vadakkumpad GHSS
 Vengad E.K.Nayanar Smaraka GHSS
 Adakatodu St Joseph HS
 Angadikadavu Sacret Heart HSS
 Chokli VP Oriental HS
 Chokly Ramavilasam HSS
 Chothavoor H.S  S. Champad
 Edoor St Mary's HSS
 Iritty HSS
 Kadavathur VHSS
 Karikottakkari St Thomas HS
 Kariyad Nambiars HSS
 Kavumpadi CHM HSS
 Kelakam St Thomas HSS
 Kilianthara St. Thomas HSS
 Kodiyeri Oniyan HS
 Kolakad Santhome HSS
 Kolavalloor HSS
 Kolayad St Cornelius HSS
 Koodali HSS
 Kottayam Rajas HS
 Kottiyoor IJM HSS
 Kunnoth St Joseph HS
 Kuthuparamba HS
 Mambram HSS
 Mattannoor HSS
 Rajeev Gandhi Memorial HSS, mokeri
 New Mahe MM HSS
 Olavilm Ramakrishna HS
 Panoor  P.R.Mem.HSS
 Panoor K.K.V. Memorial  HSS
 Pattannur KPC HSS
 Peravoor St Joseph HS
 Peringathur NAM Memorial HSS
 Sivapuram HSS
 Thalasserry MMHSS
 Thalasserry Sacred Heart HSS
 Thalassery BEMP HSS
 Thalassery St Joseph HSS
 Velimanam St.Seb.HSS
 Kelakam Little Flower HS
 Zahra HSS-Mokeri
 Kadathumkadav St. John Baptist Eng. Med. H
 Nirmalagiri Ranijai HSS
 Peringadi Indian Public School

References 

Education in Kannur district
Lists of universities and colleges in Kerala